Teen Daze is the stage name for solo Canadian electronic musician Jamison Isaak originally from Abbotsford, British Columbia.

His first albums were released in 2010, attracting the attention of online music press outlets such as Pitchfork Media. Signing with Lefse Records, he released the full-length All of Us Together in 2012, followed quickly by Glacier in 2013. On his 2015 John Vanderslice-produced album Morning World, Teen Daze shifted from an electronic-driven style with elements of chillwave, house, and ambient to more of an indie pop sound, adding his own vocals.

Teen Daze released Interior in 2021, describing it as "an album of first loves refracted through prisms of wisdom, wounds, and wonder." The album won the Juno Award for Electronic Album of the Year at the Juno Awards of 2023.

Discography
Albums
 My Bedroom Floor (self-released, 2010)
 Four More Years (self-released, 2010)
 The Inner Mansions (Lefse Records, 2012)
 All of Us Together (Lefse, 2012)
 Glacier (Lefse, 2013)
 Morning World (Paper Bag Records, 2015)
 Themes for Dying Earth (Flora, 2017)
 Themes for a New Earth (Flora, 2017)
Bioluminescence (Flora, 2019)
Interior (Cascine, 2021)

EPs
 Beach Dreams (self-released, 2010)
 A Silent Planet (Waaga Records, 2011)
 Reinterprets Selections From "Mend" By Geotic (Cultus Vibes, 2011)
 Tour EP (self-released, 2011)
 A World Away (Plancha Records, 2015)
 Rainwater Coffee (self-released, 2015)
 Pure Water (Inspired by 'The Outlaw Ocean' a book by Ian Urbina) (self-released, 2020)
 Reality Refresh (self-released, 2020)
 Reality Refresh 2 (self-released, 2020)
 Reality Refresh 3 (self-released, 2020)
 Reality Refresh 4 (self-released, 2020)
 Breathing Tides (self-released, 2021)
 Natural Movement (self-released, 2023)

Singles
 Together b/w Something (Cultus Vibes, 2011)
 Let's Groove (self-released, 2011)

References

Musicians from British Columbia
Canadian electronic musicians
Canadian indie pop musicians
Juno Award for Electronic Album of the Year winners